The Kraepelinian dichotomy is the division of the major endogenous psychoses into the disease concepts of dementia praecox, which was reformulated as schizophrenia by Eugen Bleuler by 1908,  and manic-depressive psychosis, which has now been reconceived as bipolar disorder. This division was formally introduced in the sixth edition of Emil Kraepelin's psychiatric textbook Psychiatrie. Ein Lehrbuch für Studirende und Aerzte, published in 1899. It has been highly influential on modern psychiatric classification systems, the DSM and ICD, and is reflected in the taxonomic separation of schizophrenia from affective psychosis. However, there is also a diagnosis of schizoaffective disorder to cover cases that seem to show symptoms of both.

History

The Kraepelinian system and the modern classification of psychoses are ultimately derived from the insights of Karl Kahlbaum. In 1863 the Prussian psychiatrist published his habilitation which was entitled, Die Gruppierung der psychischen Krankheiten (The Classification of Psychiatric Diseases). In this text he reviewed the then heterogeneous state of medical taxonomies of mental illness and enumerated the existence of some thirty such nosologies from the early seventeenth-century until the mid-nineteenth-century. The major contribution of his published dissertation, which is still the foundation of modern psychiatric nosology, was to first formulate the clinical method for the classification of psychosis by symptom, course and outcome.

Kahlbaum also differentiated between two major groups of mental illnesses which he termed vecordia and vesania.

Emil Kraepelin first introduced his proposed dichotomy between the endogenous psychoses of manic-depressive illness and dementia praecox during a public lecture in Heidelberg, Germany on 27 November 1898.

See also

 Comparison of bipolar disorder and schizophrenia
 History of bipolar disorder
 History of schizophrenia

Notes

Bibliography

 
 
 
 
Briole, G. (2012). "Emil Kraepelin: The Fragility of a Colossal Oeuvre". Hurly-Burly 8: 125-147.
 
 
 
 
 
 
 
 
 
 
 
 
 
 
 
 
 
 
 
 
 
 
 
 
 
 

Classification of mental disorders
Psychosis
History of mental disorders
Psychiatry controversies